Nikolayevsky is a rural locality (a khutor) in Verkhnekardailskoye Rural Settlement, Novonikolayevsky District, Volgograd Oblast, Russia. The population was 154 as of 2010. There are 7 streets.

Geography 
Nikolayevsky is located in steppe, on the Khopyorsko-Buzulukskaya Plain, on the bank of the Kardail River, 38 km northeast of Novonikolayevsky (the district's administrative centre) by road. Verkhnekardailsky is the nearest rural locality.

References 

Rural localities in Novonikolayevsky District